Buck Creek is a  tributary of the Cahaba River that was used to supply water power for manufacturing and industry during the 19th century. Its current use is primarily recreational and as a discharge point for municipal water treatment facilities.

Route
Buck Creek is entirely contained within Shelby County, Alabama, with a flow direction (generally southeast to northwest) against the prevailing orientation of valleys and ridges in central Alabama. The farthest headwaters of the creek lie on Double Mountain, from where the creek flows south, turning west at Saginaw. Passing under U.S. Route 31, Interstate 65, and State Route 119, Buck Creek turns north and passes Siluria and the cities of Alabaster and Pelham.  Turning northwest, the creek passes the city of Helena. The creek is dammed upstream of State Route 261 in the Old Town area to form Lake Davidson which was used for recreation and water wheel power at the turn of the 20th century. This dam is illuminated at night. Continuing northwest, Buck Creek reaches the Cahaba River below the CSX Transportation S&NA South Subdivision railroad bridge.

Crossings

Tributaries
The major tributary of Buck Creek is Cahaba Valley Creek which enters Buck Creek near the Helena/Pelham city limits. Cahaba Valley Creek continues to the northeast, following the general orientation of the valley and ridge system of central Alabama to its source within Oak Mountain State Park. Cahaba Valley Creek is dammed to form Beaver Lake within Oak Mountain State Park. Also arising in Oak Mountain State Park, Peavine Creek joins Buck Creek upstream of Cahaba Valley Creek.

Uses
Currently Buck Creek is used as a recreational resource and as the discharge point for municipal water treatment facilities in Helena and Pelham. Fishing, wading, and canoeing are popular uses of the waterway. Alabama Small Boats in Helena provides shuttle service and rental canoes for those wishing to canoe the creek. The Old Town Amphitheater park in Helena lines Buck Creek and is a popular spot for picnics and recreation. Annually the Buck Creek Festival is held at this park in late spring, drawing thousands of visitors. A historic marker for the Central Iron Works rolling mill, built on the banks of Buck Creek in 1865 and since destroyed, is at the intersection of Lake Davidson Road and Route 261 in Helena.

Gallery

References

Rivers of Alabama
Rivers of Shelby County, Alabama